The year 1810 in archaeology involved some significant events.

Explorations

Excavations
 Colosseum, Rome: The arena substructure is partly excavated during 1810-1814.
 Stonehenge, Wiltshire, England: Second excavations by William Cunnington and Richard Colt Hoare.

Publications
 Alexander von Humboldt publishes illustrated accounts of Pre-Columbian ruins of Mesoamerica including Mitla and Xochicalco.
 Richard Colt Hoare begins publication of The Ancient History of Wiltshire in England.

Births
 11 April: Henry Rawlinson, English Assyriologist (d. 1895).
 26 July: Henry Christy, English ethnologist, archaeologist and sponsor (d. 1865).

Deaths
 30 March: Luigi Lanzi, Italian archaeologist (b 1732).
 31 December: William Cunnington, English antiquarian (b. 1754).

See also
 Roman Forum - excavations

References

Archaeology
Archaeology by year
Archaeology
Archaeology